Unibank is one of the largest private banks established in Azerbaijan in July 1992 under the name of MBank. In 2021, Unibank co-founded the first Azerbaijani neobank called Leobank.

The bank was established on 15 October 2002 as a result of the merger of the two advanced private commercial banks of Azerbaijan MBank and PROMTEKHBANK. On October 15, 2002, after the merger of MBank with PROMTEXBANK, one of the leading banks of Azerbaijan, the bank's name was changed to Unibank.

Leobank 

Leobank is the first Azerbaijani neobank built and launched on the basis of Unibank in 2021.

Leobank was developed by the Fintech Farm company of Dmytro Dubilet together with Unibank in order to develop digital banking in Azerbaijan. Leobank was launched in August 2021, with a pre-order campaign. In November 2021 the banking cards became available to all customers.

With Leobank cards, clients can get a credit limit directly in the application, store personal funds, receive cashback and make various payments. The card can also be used as a debit card. In January 2022, the number of bank customers exceeded 100,000.

According to the Unibank report for January 2022, the Leobank mobile application is used by 35,400 customers per day; the number of active users per week reaches 81,000. During the period of operation, the bank conducted more than 3 million 200 thousand transactions worth more than 200 million manats.

The symbol of the bank is a lion with a purple mane.

Supervisory Board 
The following are members:
 Eldar Garibov – Chairman of the Supervisory Board
 Faig Huseynov – Member of the Supervisory Board, Deputy Chairman of the Supervisory Board
 Emin Guliyev  – Member of the Supervisory Board
 Elkhan Garibli – Member of the Supervisory Board
 Kamen Zahariyev – Member of the Supervisory Board

The Management Board
The following are members:
 Farid Abushov – Chairman of the Management board, Executive Director
 Heybat Gadirov – Member of the Management Board, Deputy Chairman of the Management Board, First Deputy Executive Director
 Faig Zeynalov – Director of Finance, Member of the Management Board, Chief Financial Officer
 Emin Rasulzada – Member of the Management Board

Marketing
Unibank were the main sponsors of the Azerbaijan Premier League, the highest Azerbaijani football division until 2009.

See also

Banking in Azerbaijan
Central Bank of Azerbaijan
Economy of Azerbaijan

References

2002 establishments in Azerbaijan
Azerbaijani companies established in 2002
Banks established in 2002
Companies based in Baku
Banks of Azerbaijan